is a collective term used by the Japanese government's Law for the Protection of Cultural Properties to denote Cultural Properties of Japan as historic locations such as shell mounds, ancient tombs, sites of palaces, sites of forts or castles, monumental dwelling houses and other sites of high historical or scientific value; gardens, bridges, gorges, mountains, and other places of great scenic beauty; and natural features such as animals, plants, and geological or mineral formations of high scientific value.

Designated monuments of Japan
The government designates (as opposed to registers) "significant" items of this kind as Cultural Properties (文化財 bunkazai) and classifies them in one of three categories:
 
 ,
 .

Items of particularly high significance may receive a higher classification as: 
 
 
 , respectively.

As of February 2019, there were 3,154 nationally designated Monuments: 1,823 Historic Sites (including 62 Special Historic Sites), 415 Places of Scenic Beauty (including 36 Special Places of Scenic Beauty), and 1,030 Natural Monuments (including 75 Special Natural Monuments). Since a single property can be included within more than one of these classes, the total number of properties is less than the sum of designations: for example Hamarikyu Gardens are both a Special Historic Site and a Special Place of Scenic Beauty.

As of 1 May 2013, there were a further 2,961 Historic Sites, 266 Places of Scenic Beauty, and 2,985 Natural Monuments designated at a prefectural level and 12,840 Historic Sites, 845 Places of Scenic Beauty, and 11,020 Natural Monuments designated at a municipal level.

Alterations to the existing state of a site or activities affecting its preservation require permission from the Commissioner for Cultural Affairs. Financial support for purchasing and conserving designated land and for the utilization of the site is available through local governments.

Designation criteria
 The Agency for Cultural Affairs designates monuments based on a number of criteria. A monument can be designated based on multiple criteria.

Historic Sites and Special Historic Sites
 Shell mounds, settlement ruins, kofun, other historic ruins of this type
 Ruins of fortified towns, castles, government administration offices, old battlefields and other historic ruins related to politics or government
 Remains of shrines and temples, former compound grounds and other historic ruins related to religion
 Schools, research institutions, cultural facilities and other historic ruins related to education, learning or culture
Medical care and welfare facilities, life related institution, other society and life related historic ruins
Transport and communication facilities, forest conservation and flood control facilities, manufacture facilities and other historic sites related to finance or manufacture activities
 Graves and stone monuments with inscriptions
 Former residences, gardens, ponds and other areas of particular historical significance
 Ruins related to foreign countries or foreigners

Places of Scenic Beauty and Special Places of Scenic Beauty
Parks and gardens
Bridges and embankments
Flowering trees, flowering grass, autumn colors, green trees and other places of dense growth
Places inhabited by birds and wild animals, fish/insects and others
Rocks, caves
Ravines, gorges, waterfalls, mountain streams, abysses
Lakes, marshes, wetlands, floating islands, springs
Sand dunes, spits, seasides, islands
Volcanoes, onsen
Mountains, hills, plateaus, plains, rivers
Viewpoints

Natural Monuments and Special Natural Monuments
 Animals
 Well-known animals peculiar to Japan and their habitat
 Animals which are not peculiar to Japan, but need to be preserved as well-known characteristic Japanese animals, and their habitat
 Animals or animal groups peculiar to Japan within their natural environment
 Domestic animals peculiar to Japan
 Well-known imported animals presently in a wild state, with the exception of domestic animals; their habitat
 Particularly valuable animal specimen
 Plants, vegetation
 Old trees of historic interest, gigantic trees, old trees, deformed trees, cultivated pulpwood, roadside trees, shrine forests
 Representative primeval forests, rare forest flora
 Representative alpine plants, special clusters of plants on rock ground
 Representative clusters of waste land plants
 Representative examples of coastal and sand ground vegetation
 Representative examples of areas of peat forming plants
 Clusters of plants growing in caves or grottoes
 Rare water plants in garden ponds, onsen, lakes, marshes, streams, sea, etc.; algae, moss, microbes, etc.
 Remarkable occurrence of epiphytic plants on rocks, trees or shrubs
 Remarkable plant growth on marginal land
 Remarkable growth in the wild of crop plants
 Wild habitat of rare or near extinct plants
　Geological and mineralogical features
 Rocks, mineral and fossil producing sites
 Conformable and unconformable strata
 Fold and thrust strata
 Geological features caused by the work of living creatures
 Phenomena related to earthquake dislocation and landmass motion
 Caves, grottoes
 Examples of rock organization
 Onsen and their sediments
 Erosion and weathering related phenomena
 Fumaroles and other items related to volcanic activity
 Ice and frost related phenomena
 Particularly precious rock, mineral and fossil specimen
 Representative territories rich in natural monuments to be protected (Natural Protected Areas)

Registered Monuments

A separate system of "registration" (as opposed to "designation" hereabove) has been established for modern edifices threatened by urban sprawl or other factors. Members of this class of Cultural Property receive more limited assistance and protection based mostly on governmental notification and guidance. As of April 2012, 61 monuments were registered under this system.

Some monuments of Japan

See also
 List of Special Places of Scenic Beauty, Special Historic Sites and Special Natural Monuments
 Cultural Properties of Japan
 Meibutsu: local specialities

Notes

References

External links

Historic Sites of Japan
Monuments
Natural monuments of Japan
Places of Scenic Beauty
Special Places of Scenic Beauty